Yericho Christiantoko (born 14 January 1992 in Malang, East Java, Indonesia) is an Indonesian professional footballer who plays as a left back for Liga 2 club Persekat Tegal.

Club career

Persijap Jepara
He was signed for Persijap Jepara to play in Liga 2 in the 2020 season. This season was suspended on 27 March 2020 due to the COVID-19 pandemic. The season was abandoned and was declared void on 20 January 2021.

Persekat Tegal
In 2021, Christiantoko signed a contract with Indonesian Liga 2 club Persekat Tegal. He made his league debut on 27 September in a 3–1 win against Badak Lampung at the Gelora Bung Karno Madya Stadium, Jakarta.

Persiraja Banda Aceh
He was signed for Persiraja Banda Aceh to play in the Liga 1 in the 2021 season. Yericho made his league debut on 8 January 2022 in a match against PSS Sleman at the Ngurah Rai Stadium, Denpasar.

International career
In 2007, Christiantoko represented the Indonesia U-16, in the 2008 AFC U-16 Championship qualification.

Honours

Club
Arema Cronus
Menpora Cup: 2013

International
Indonesia U-23
Southeast Asian Games  Silver medal: 2011

References

External links
 
 Yericho Christiantoko at Liga Indonesia

1992 births
Living people
Sportspeople from Malang
Indonesian footballers
Indonesian expatriate footballers
Expatriate footballers in Belgium
Indonesian expatriate sportspeople in Belgium
Liga 1 (Indonesia) players
C.S. Visé players
Arema F.C. players
Southeast Asian Games silver medalists for Indonesia
Southeast Asian Games medalists in football
Association football fullbacks
Competitors at the 2011 Southeast Asian Games
21st-century Indonesian people